The 1981 Mid Glamorgan County Council election was held in May 1981 and were the third elections to Mid Glamorgan County Council, electing 85 councillors. They were preceded by the 1977 elections and followed by the 1985 elections.

Ward Results

Aberdare No.1: Llwydcoed (two seats)
Labour comfortably held both seats. Plaid Cymru, who held a seat in the ward from 1973 to 1977, did not field a candidate.

Aberdare No.2: Blaengwawr (one seat)

Aberdare No.3: Gadlys (one seat)

Aberdare No.4: Town (one seat)

Aberdare No.5: Aberaman (one seat)

Abertridwr and Senghennydd

Bedwas and Machen (two seats)

Bedwellty No.1 Aberbargoed (one seat)

Bedwellty No.2 Abertysswg (one seat)

Bridgend (two seats)

Caerphilly No.1 (one seat)

Caerphilly No.2 Llanbradach (one seat)

Caerphilly No.4 (one seat)
Bertie Rowland, a long-serving Labour councilor on the former Glamorgan County Council, regained the seat that he narrowly lost four years previously.

Caerphilly No.5 North (one seat)

Caerphilly No.6 South (one seat)

Caerphilly No.7 (one seat)

Cardiff Rural (one seat)

Cowbridge Rural (one seat)

Dowlais (one seat)

Gelligaer No.1 (one seat)

Gelligaer No.2 (one seat)

Gelligaer No.3 (one seat)

Gelligaer No.4 (two seats)

Llantrisant and Llantwitfardre No.1 (four seats)

Llantrisant and Llantwit Fardre No.2 (two seats)

Maesteg No.1 (one seat)

Maesteg No.2 (one seat)

Maesteg No.3 (one seat)

Merthyr, Cyfarthfa (one seat)

Merthyr No.6 (one seat)

Merthyr No.7 (one seat)

Merthyr Park (two seats)

Merthyr Town (one seat)

Mountain Ash No.1 (one seat)

Mountain Ash No.2 (one seat)

Mountain Ash No.3 (two seats)

Ogmore and Garw No.1 (one seat)

Ogmore and Garw No.2 (two seats)

Penybont No.1 (one seat)

Penybont No.2 (one seat)
Walters had previously represented the neighbouring Penybont No.1 Ward which was also lost by the Conservatives.

Penybont No.3 (one seat)

Penybont No.4 (one seat)

Penybont No.5 (two seats)

Penybont No.6 (two seats)

Penydarren (one seat)

Pontypridd No.1 (one seat)

Pontypridd No.2 Town (one seat)

Pontypridd No.3 (one seat)

Pontypridd No.4 Trallwn (one seat)

Pontypridd No.5 Rhydyfelin (one seat)

Pontypridd No.6 (one seat)

Porthcawl No.1 (one seat)

Porthcawl No.2 (one seat)

Rhondda No.1 Treherbert (two seats)

Rhondda No.2 Treorchy (two seats)

Rhondda No.3 Pentre (one seat)

Rhondda No.4 Ystrad (one seat)

Rhondda No.5 (one seat)

Rhondda No.6 (one seat)

Rhondda No.7 Penygraig (one seat)

Rhondda No.8 Porth (two seats)

Rhondda No.9 (one seat)

Rhymney Lower, Middle and Upper (one seat)

Treharris (one seat)

Vaynor and Penderyn No.1 (one seat)

Vaynor and Penderyn No.2 (one seat)

References

1981 Welsh local elections
1981